Sea Train is a South Korean tourist train operated by the Korail Tourism Development. The train began operations in 2007 and transports tourists along the eastern coast of South Korea.

Overview

The train began running on July 25, 2007, and travels 58 kilometers (36 miles) through Gangneung, Donghae, and Samcheok all in Gangwon-do, providing views of the Sea of Japan. These three communities, along with Korail, developed the rail trip, with Korail contributing the passenger train service and the railroad, and the communities investing money to modify ordinary passenger cars into ones with seats that faced the sea.

Sometimes called the "ocean train", it was one of the industrial-era train renovations and part of Korail's Tourism Development initiative in the mid-2000s to change existing coal industry railway lines, where service had declined, into tour lines. 

The train has four cars, three of them with seats that face the windows, for a full ocean-view and the fourth car has family seats where passengers can face each other. The interior walls are painted in ocean-blue colors to simulate an undersea world. Activities on the train include talks on the Gangneung and Samcheok regions, and music, including passenger requests via text message, and a marriage proposal room.

One of the train stops is at Jeongdongjin station, which was made famous by a popular 90's Korean drama, The Hourglass. Jeongdongjin itself is one of the most popular travel destinations for Koreans to view the sunrise and has several off-train local tourist activities like the rail bike which runs from Jeongdongjin Station to local spots.

Operations

Started running: July 25, 2007
 Seoul to Sea Train stations: Cheongnyangni station in Seoul to Gangneung station from KTX trains / Donghae station from Mugunghwa trains
Stations: Gangneung station - Jeongdongjin station - Mukho station - Donghae station - Ch'uam station - Samcheok Haebyeon station
Approximate travel time: 1 hour 10 min.

See also
Jeongdongjin
Jeongdongjin station
Sun Cruise Resort & Yacht

References

External links

Sea Train at Korail 

Passenger trains of the Korail
Tourist trains in South Korea